Marco Pischorn (born 1 January 1986 in Mühlacker) is a German retired football defender.

In October 2007, he was promoted to the first team of VfB Stuttgart. He had his professional debut on 27 October 2007 against Bayer Leverkusen. He left for SV Sandhausen in 2010, where he would spend three and a half years before joining Preußen Münster.

References

External links 
 

1986 births
Living people
People from Mühlacker
Sportspeople from Karlsruhe (region)
Association football defenders
German footballers
VfB Stuttgart players
VfB Stuttgart II players
SV Sandhausen players
SC Preußen Münster players
Bundesliga players
2. Bundesliga players
3. Liga players
Footballers from Baden-Württemberg
21st-century German people